Mana is a locality of Porirua City in New Zealand, part of the Suburb of Paremata. It is a narrow isthmus bounded to the west by the entrance to Porirua Harbour, and to the east by the Pauatahanui inlet of the Porirua Harbour. Mana Island lies about three kilometres west of the isthmus.

State Highway 59 and the North Island Main Trunk railway both pass through the centre of Mana; the state highway route was previously part of State Highway 1 until  SH 1 was shifted to the Transmission Gully Motorway on 7 December 2021. A significant increase in the traffic capacity through Mana occurred in 2005-2006 when a second bridge on the state highway route was added at the southern end, transit lanes were introduced and several sets of traffic lights were added as part of the Plimmerton to Paremata upgrade.

History
Mana was known as Dolly Varden (after a ship) until 1960 when local pressure resulted in the area being renamed Mana.

Notes

References

External links
Mana-Camborne Community Profile from Statistics NZ
SH1 Plimmerton to Paremata Upgrade

Porirua